Jukka Tapio Pietikäinen (born 1956) is a Finnish diplomat. He was the Finnish Consul General in New York, where he moved from the post of Finnish Ambassador to Buenos Aires. Pietikäinen started his diplomatic career in 1985.

References

Ambassadors of Finland to Argentina
1956 births
Living people
Place of birth missing (living people)
Date of birth missing (living people)